Kuan Hong  (born 15 January 1995), also known as Darren Chen, is a Taiwanese actor and model. He is best known for his roles in Meteor Garden (2018), My Unicorn Girl, and The Sleuth of the Ming Dynasty (2020).

Early life and education
Darren Chen was born on January 15, 1995, in Taipei, Taiwan. He graduated from the Taipei Municipal Heping High School.

Career

2016–2018: Beginnings and rising popularity
In 2016, Chen made his acting debut as Lin Yutang in the youth fantasy web series Proud of Love and its sequel. 

In 2017, Chen was cast in the role of Huaze Lei by Angie Chai in the 2018 adaptation of Meteor Garden, based on the Japanese shōjo manga series  written by Yoko Kamio.
He appeared in Harper's Bazaar China with his Meteor Garden costars Dylan Wang, Connor Leong, and Caesar Wu in the November issue. The series was first broadcast in Hunan TV in 9 July 2018, and Chen rose to fame. The same year was confirmed to make his big screen debut with a guest appearance in the romance comedy film Oversize Love.

2019–present: Leading roles
In 2019, Chen was cast in his first leading role in the historical mystery drama The Sleuth of the Ming Dynasty, produced by Jackie Chan. The series premiered on iQiyi on April 1, 2020. The same year, he starred in the youth sports drama My Unicorn Girl.

In 2021, he starred in the TV Series, No Boundary and No Boundary Season 2.

Filmography

Film

Television series

Variety shows

Discography

References

External links
 
 
 

Taiwanese male television actors
Taiwanese male film actors
21st-century Taiwanese male actors
1995 births
Living people